Trichococcus alkaliphilus is a psychrotolerant and facultative anaerobic bacterium from the genus Trichococcus which has been isolated from the Zoige Wetland from the Qinghai-Tibetan Plateau.

References

Lactobacillales
Bacteria described in 2018